The Indian mud moray eel, (Gymnothorax tile)  is a moray eel found in the western Pacific and Indian Oceans. It was first named by Hamilton in 1822, and is also commonly known as the freshwater moray or freshwater snowflake eel.

Description 
These eels can live up to 30 years. The species is characterized by a gray-brown body with speckles that cover their entire length of their body and vary in color from golden yellow to white. Gymnothorax tile, like any other moray eel, possesses a second set of jaws, called the pharyngeal jaws, to swallow their prey. This eel also possesses terrible eyesight, and instead relies upon a keen sense of smell and vibrations in the water to detect prey or approaching threats.

Habitat 
The habitat type of freshwater moray is marine neritic. It is most commonly found in debris over soft substrate of mud or sand. It often occurs in estuaries but may also enter the lower portions of rivers.  It lives in marine conditions, but travels to fresh water for breeding and spawning.

When kept as pets, Indian mud morays actually thrive better in brackish water, rather than pure fresh water. Pure fresh water can cause these eels to reject their food and develop a variety of deadly diseases that greatly shorten their life span. It is advisable to place a lid on the tank as they are known to have the ability to jump out of aquarium tanks.

Diet 
They are found solitary and feed on crustaceans and small fishes. It is for the most part a scavenger that eats dead fish, shrimp, and other such foods. Due to its poor eyesight, this eel does not hunt on a normal basis, but will resort to hunting if there is no other option. 

When kept in captivity these eels can be difficult to feed, due to their tendency to reject food that is not to their liking. Stress can also cause these eels to starve themselves, even to death in some cases.

Synonyms

Threat to the species 
Gymnothorax tile is known from the Indo-West Pacific from India to the Philippines, Indonesia, New Guinea, Hawaii, and the Andaman Islands. It appears to be uncommon throughout its range. There are no major threats known to this species, although it may be impacted by coastal development, runoff and habitat degradation in some portions of its distribution. And, though there are no species-specific conservation methods in place for its protection, this species is listed as "Least Concern."

Etymology 
Gymnothorax comes from the Ancient Greek γυμνός (gymno-), meaning ‘naked’, and θώραξ (thoraks), meaning ‘breastplate, corslet’ and tile: from the Bengali vernacular name for this species.

Geographic location 
Gymnothorax tile is known from the Indo-West Pacific from India east to Queensland, Australia, and including the Andaman Islands, Indonesia and the Philippines. It has been reported from Hawaii, but the specimen is unavailable (Mundy 2005), and thus its presence in Hawaii needs to be verified. It is found from 0-10 m depth.

References

tile
Fish described in 1822